The women's 800 metres event  at the 1994 European Athletics Indoor Championships was held in Palais Omnisports de Paris-Bercy on 12 and 13 March.

Medalists

Results

Heats
First 3 from each heat qualified directly (Q) for the final.

Final

References

800 metres at the European Athletics Indoor Championships
800
1994 in women's athletics